Hayley Warner (born 23 January 1992) is an Australian singer-songwriter. In 2009, she finished as runner-up in the seventh and final Australian Idol, and was noted for her high-energy performances and vast vocal range. In 2013, The Daily Telegraph named Warner one of Australia's most accomplished songwriters. Warner's songwriting credits total over 11 times platinum in worldwide sales. Hayley co-wrote Grammy nominated artist Tori Kelly's single "Hollow", which was released 3 November 2015. After moving to Los Angeles, Warner signed a worldwide publishing deal with Warner/Chappell Music in 2015.

Life and career

Early life 
As a young child, Warner was incredibly passionate about sports and set her sights on becoming the best, but at the age of seven, she was diagnosed with Legg–Calvé–Perthes disease which stripped her of her sporting dreams and forced her to learn to walk again. Through her struggle, music quickly became her therapy and true calling. When she was just twelve years old she started her first band, Cloud 9. From the ages of twelve to sixteen, she performed at 500 different venues around Australia.

2009–present 
Warner signed to Sony Music shortly after the Australian Idol finale, on 22 November 2009. Her first single debuted and peaked at No. 11 on the ARIA Singles Chart on 20 December 2009, and was certified gold.

In 2012, she signed a worldwide publishing deal with Sony ATV and began collaborating with songwriter and producers all around the world.

Warner co-wrote "Good Night" which was chosen by Sony Records to be the first single for The X Factor Australia season 3 winner Reece Mastin. "Good Night" reached No. 1 in both Australia and New Zealand, and achieved 5 times Platinum accreditation in Australia and Platinum sales in New Zealand. "Good Night" is the fastest selling digital single by an artist signed to Sony Music Australia in history. She then teamed up with Mastin and co-wrote his second single "Shut Up & Kiss Me" which reached No. 2 on the ARIA Singles Chart and achieved platinum sales in Australia and No. 1 with Gold sales in New Zealand. She also co-wrote "Set Me on Fire" which was chosen for season 4 contestant Bella Ferraro. The single was released in December 2012, and debuted at No. 36 on the ARIA Singles Chart. She co-wrote "Freedom" for artist Stan Walker that was selected for a three-year TV advertising campaign for The Salvation Army in Australia and New Zealand. She co-wrote with Tina Arena for her ninth studio album Reset. The album was released in October 2013, and spent 18 weeks in the ARIA Top 50 including debuting No. 4. Her co-written single "Still Running" was translated to French for the European release of the album. Her song, "Once" was recorded by Angy for her 2013 album Drama Queen. In 2013, she co-wrote the two runner-up singles for X Factor Australia contestants Taylor Henderson and Jai Waetford. Henderson's single "Borrow My Heart" debuted at No. 1 and has achieved double Platinum accreditation. Waetford's single "Your Eyes" debuted at No. 6 and has achieved Gold sales. She also co-wrote Henderson's second single "When You Were Mine" which debuted No. 5 and achieved Platinum sales. She co-wrote four tracks on his second studio album Burnt Letters, which debuted at No. 1 on the ARIA Album Charts, achieved Gold status within a week of its release, and is now certified Platinum. The album's fifth single "Brighter Days" is now being used as the theme song for the highest rated national morning TV show in Australia, Sunrise. In 2014, she co-wrote "Stand by You" which was selected as the single for X Factor Australia season 6 winner Marlisa Punzalan. The track debuted at No. 2 on the ARIA Singles Chart and is currently double Platinum. The track also reached No. 7 in Singapore and No. 21 in New Zealand.

In 2015, Warner was an APRA Music Awards Nominee for Pop Work of the Year and was selected for the exclusive APRA AMCOS SongHubs in Los Angeles.

After penning multiple hits for various artists around the world, Warner found it vital to find her own voice and write about the stories of her own life. In 2015, she released her highly anticipated new single, "Closure".

Discography

Extended plays

Singles

Music videos

Songwriting credits

References

External links
 Official Site

1992 births
Australian Idol participants
Australian child singers
Singers from Sydney
Living people
Australian women pop singers
21st-century Australian singers
21st-century Australian women singers